Khereddine, also spelled Khéreddine or Kheireddine is a residential city in the northern suburbs of Tunis. Khereddine is linked to Tunis by the  TGM railway.

External links
Khereddine at Google Maps

Populated places in Tunisia